The meridian 83° west of Greenwich is a line of longitude that extends from the North Pole across the Arctic Ocean, North America, the Gulf of Mexico, the Caribbean Sea, Costa Rica, Panama the Pacific Ocean, the Southern Ocean, and Antarctica to the South Pole.

The 83rd meridian west forms a great circle with the 97th meridian east.

From Pole to Pole
Starting at the North Pole and heading south to the South Pole, the 83rd meridian west passes through:

{| class="wikitable plainrowheaders" style="width: 80%;"
! scope="col" style="width: 25%;"| Co-ordinates
! scope="col" style="width: 25%;"| Country, territory or sea
! scope="col" style="width: 50%;"| Notes
|-
| style="background:#b0e0e6;" | 
! scope="row" style="background:#b0e0e6;" | Arctic Ocean
| style="background:#b0e0e6;" |
|-
| 
! scope="row" | 
| Nunavut — Ellesmere Island
|-
| style="background:#b0e0e6;" | 
! scope="row" style="background:#b0e0e6;" | Jones Sound
| style="background:#b0e0e6;" |
|-
| 
! scope="row" | 
| Nunavut — Devon Island
|-
| style="background:#b0e0e6;" | 
! scope="row" style="background:#b0e0e6;" | Lancaster Sound
| style="background:#b0e0e6;" |
|-
| 
! scope="row" | 
| Nunavut — Baffin Island
|-
| style="background:#b0e0e6;" | 
! scope="row" style="background:#b0e0e6;" | Fury and Hecla Strait
| style="background:#b0e0e6;" |
|-valign="top"
| 
! scope="row" | 
| Nunavut — Liddon Island,  and Winter Island
|-
| style="background:#b0e0e6;" | 
! scope="row" style="background:#b0e0e6;" | Foxe Basin
| style="background:#b0e0e6;" |
|-
| 
! scope="row" | 
| Nunavut — Southampton Island
|-
| style="background:#b0e0e6;" | 
! scope="row" style="background:#b0e0e6;" | Evans Strait
| style="background:#b0e0e6;" |
|-
| 
! scope="row" | 
| Nunavut — Coats Island
|-
| style="background:#b0e0e6;" | 
! scope="row" style="background:#b0e0e6;" | Hudson Bay
| style="background:#b0e0e6;" |
|-valign="top"
| 
! scope="row" | 
| 
|-
| style="background:#b0e0e6;" | 
! scope="row" style="background:#b0e0e6;" | Lake Huron
| style="background:#b0e0e6;" |
|-
| 
! scope="row" | 
| Michigan — passing through Detroit 
|-
| 
! scope="row" | 
| Ontario — passing through Windsor 
|-
| style="background:#b0e0e6;" | 
! scope="row" style="background:#b0e0e6;" | Lake Erie
| style="background:#b0e0e6;" |
|-valign="top"
| 
! scope="row" | 
| Ohio — passing through Columbus 
|-valign="top"
| style="background:#b0e0e6;" | 
! scope="row" style="background:#b0e0e6;" | Gulf of Mexico
| style="background:#b0e0e6;" | Passing just west of the Dry Tortugas islands, Florida,  (at )
|-
| 
! scope="row" | 
|
|-
| style="background:#b0e0e6;" | 
! scope="row" style="background:#b0e0e6;" | Caribbean Sea
| style="background:#b0e0e6;" | Gulf of Batabanó
|-
| 
! scope="row" | 
| Isla de la Juventud
|-valign="top"
| style="background:#b0e0e6;" | 
! scope="row" style="background:#b0e0e6;" | Caribbean Sea
| style="background:#b0e0e6;" | Passing through the Miskito Cays,  (at ) Passing between the Corn Islands,  (at )
|-
| 
! scope="row" | 
|
|-
| 
! scope="row" | 
| For about 8 km
|-
| 
! scope="row" | 
| For about 4 km
|-
| style="background:#b0e0e6;" | 
! scope="row" style="background:#b0e0e6;" | Pacific Ocean
| style="background:#b0e0e6;" |
|-
| style="background:#b0e0e6;" | 
! scope="row" style="background:#b0e0e6;" | Southern Ocean
| style="background:#b0e0e6;" |
|-
| 
! scope="row" | Antarctica
| Territory claimed by 
|-
|}

See also
82nd meridian west
84th meridian west

w083 meridian west